Kampong Serdang is a village in Brunei-Muara District, Brunei. The population was 609 in 2016. It is one of the villages within Mukim Kota Batu. The postcode is BD2117.

Facilities 
The village mosque is Kampong Serdang Mosque; the construction began in 1995 and completed in the following year. It can accommodate 1,000 worshippers.

References 

Serdang